Paperback Hero is a 1999 Australian romantic comedy film starring Claudia Karvan and Hugh Jackman. It was directed by Antony Bowman who also wrote the screenplay. The film was predominantly shot in Queensland including Nindigully.

Plot
Truck driver Jack Willis from rural Australia writes a bestselling novel, but because of its romantic content uses the name, 'Ruby Vale', the name of his best friend. When a publisher - Ziggy - decides to take the author "Ruby Vale" on, Jack is suddenly faced with a dilemma. He tells his friend Ruby what he has done, and initially she wants to tell the publisher. Jack and his agent convince her to stay silent, and in exchange, they'll organise her wedding (she is marrying Jack's best friend, Hamish) and Ruby is convinced.

Ruby and Jack go to Sydney to help promote the book. On the way, Ruby reads his book and realises the lead female character is herself, and the male protagonist, Brian, is Jack. She is deeply touched.

Hamish arrives in Sydney. He knows Jack is the author and tells Ruby he knows, just before she is about to go on a satellite feed through to London. All of this is too much for Ruby and she makes her way back to her hometown.

Jack does not follow her, instead staying in Sydney whilst trying to decide. Back at home in the pub, Ruby hears Jack's voice coming from the TV. She hears him admit that he is the book's author.

Hamish breaks up with Ruby, knowing she really loves Jack. As Ruby is driving home, she sees a plane flying overhead, spelling the words "I love you". As she stops her car, the plane lands in front of her. Jack hops out, and after some gentle sparring of words, they kiss.

Cast
Hugh Jackman as Jack Willis
Claudia Karvan as Ruby Vale
Angie Milliken as Ziggy Keane
Andrew S. Gilbert as Hamish
Jeanie Drynan as Suzie

Reception

Reviewing the film on The Movie Show, David Stratton felt the story worked very well for the first half-hour, but was let down by laboured plot developments and a slowed pace from thereon. He did commend Jackman and Karvan for making a great romantic team, and also praised Jeanie Drynan for her performance. He gave the film 2½ stars out of 5. Margaret Pomeranz gave the film a much more favourable review and 3½ stars.

Paperback Hero grossed $1,369,280 at the box office in Australia.

See also
 Cinema of Australia

References

External links 
 
Paperback Hero at Oz Movies

1999 films
Films about writers
1999 romantic comedy films
Australian romantic comedy films
Films set in Queensland
Films set in Sydney
Films shot in Brisbane
1990s English-language films